"Legends Never Die" is a song by American pop rock band Against the Current. It was released on September 24, 2017, as an exclusive song for the 2017 League of Legends World Championship. The song was written by the Riot Games Music Team, Alex Seaver and Justin Tranter and produced by the Riot Games Music Team, Alex Seaver and Oliver. Alan Walker created a remix of the song.

On October 18, 2017, the official music video was released on Riot Games' YouTube channel.

Track listing

Certifications

References

2017 songs
Songs written by Justin Tranter
League of Legends World Championship
Sports events official songs and anthems